Cha-ian Airport is  a Thai military airport operated by the Fourth Army, Royal Thai Army in the Pak Phun sub-district of Nakhon Si Thammarat Province, Thailand. The Thai Airways Company formerly used Cha-ian Airport for passenger flights between Nakhon Si Thammarat-Surat Thani-Bangkok. Today, the airport is used by the military to transport the royal family.

History
In 1916,  King Rama VI built temporary accommodation at Suan-Jun sub-district or Royal Thai 4th Army (Cha Eian Airport).

Starting in 1985, Thai Airways Company operated passenger services at Cha-ian Airport until 1988 when it merged into Thai International.

On 1 December 1998, Nakhon Si Thammarat Airport opened for commercial services, and Cha-ian Airport is now a military airbase.

Former airlines and destinations
As of December 2014 there are no scheduled flights from this airport. Formerly, Thai Airways operated flights from here to Surat Thani and Bangkok.

References

Airports in Thailand
Buildings and structures in Nakhon Si Thammarat province
Airports established in 1916
1916 establishments in Siam